The Lost Broken Bones is the sixth full-length studio album by Israeli punk band Useless ID. It is the band's first album on the Suburban Home label, and was released in Japan on July 23, 2008 through the Bullion label, and on October 18, 2008 in the rest of the world, in a special release show in Tel Aviv, Israel. Special guests at the Israeli release show included Danny Sanderson, Muki, Avital Tamir of Betzefer and Sha'anan Streett of Hadag Nahash.

Like their previous album, it was also recorded at the Blasting Room in Colorado and produced by punk drummer and producer Bill Stevenson.

The first single from the album was "Blood Pressure" which was released in August 2008 in Japan and on the band's Myspace page and on September 8, 2008 in Israel.

The album was also pressed on vinyl via Suburban Home Records. The CD version released via Suburban Home also included a copy of the band's 2006 DVD, Ratfaces Home Videos Presents Useless ID.

It is also the band's first album with drummer Jonathan Harpak (although he was also credited on the band's previous album, he did not play on it).

July 24, 2015 album was re-released by band current label Fat Wreck Records with seven bonus tracks.

Track listing

Personnel
 Yotam Ben-Horin - lead vocals, bass
 Ishay Berger - lead guitar, acoustic guitar, backing vocals
 Guy Carmel - rhythm guitar, backing vocals
 Jonathan Harpak - drums, percussion, keyboards, backing vocals

Additional musicians
Stephen Egerton - lead guitar on "Isolate Me"
Saul Eshet - organ (spooky hamond intro) on "Night Stalker"
Yonatan Lev - noises (Crumble noise intro) on "Night Stalker"

Production
Bill Stevenson - producer, engineer, mixing
Jason Livermore - producer, engineer, mixing, mastering
Andrew Berlin - engineering

Release history

References

2008 albums
Useless ID albums
Albums produced by Bill Stevenson (musician)